Joshua Nkomo Statue is a historical monument of late former Zimbabwean Vice President and liberation war hero Joshua Nkomo who died on 1 July 1999.

The bronze statue was sculpted by North Korean company Mansudae Art Studio and is erected at the intersection of Joshua Nkomo Street and 8th Avenue in Bulawayo, Zimbabwe's second largest city. The statue was unveiled 14 years after his death on the country's Unity Day, 22 December in 2013, a date that coincided with the signing of the Unity Accord in 1987 between Robert Mugabe and Joshua Nkomo which united the rivale ZANU PF and ZAPU parties. On the same day, there was the official renaming of Main Street to Joshua Mqabuko Nkomo Street and the official opening of the Joshua Mqabuko Nkomo International Airport Mall in honor of Joshua Nkomo.

In 2018, free wi-fi was installed at the statue for tourist who come to view the monument.

Controversy
Nkomo's statue was first erected in 2010 but was pulled down before its official unveiling after the Nkomo family expressed unhappiness with the dimensions of the initial pedestal. Several Zimbabweans and Nkomo's supporters were not happy with the fact that a North Korean company was contracted to do the monument yet the same country is said to be responsible for training a Fifth Brigade which terrorised people in Matabeleland and Midlands regions from 1982 to 1987 killing more than 20 000 people during that era including Joshua Nkomo's rebel group. Zimbabwean parliamentarians questioned the decision to overlook a Zimbabwean artist David Mutasa for the contract and there was a debate about the issue in parliament.

References

2013 sculptures
Statues in Zimbabwe
Mansudae Overseas Projects
Monuments and memorials in Zimbabwe